In organic chemistry, ethenone is the formal name for ketene, an organic compound with formula  or  .  It is the simplest member of the ketene class. It is an important reagent for acetylations.

Properties 
Ethenone is a highly reactive gas (at standard conditions) and has a sharp irritating odour. It is only reasonably stable at low temperatures (−80 °C). It must therefore always be prepared for each use and processed immediately, otherwise a dimerization to diketene occurs or it reacts to polymers that are difficult to handle. The polymer content formed during the preparation is reduced, for example, by adding sulfur dioxide to the ketene gas. Because of its cumulative double bonds, ethenone is highly reactive and reacts in an addition reaction H-acidic compounds to the corresponding acetic acid derivatives. It does for example react with water to acetic acid or with primary or secondary amines to the corresponding acetamides.

Preparation 
In industrial chemistry, ketene is produced by the dehydration reaction of acetic acid:
 C2H4O2 -> C2H2O + H2O

On a laboratory scale it can be produced by the thermal decomposition of Meldrum's acid at temperatures greater than 200 °C.

History
When passed through heated pipes or electrically heated metal (like copper) wires at 500-600 °C in the presence of carbon disulfide, acetone decomposes into methane and ethenone, with 95% yield.
Ethenone was discovered at the same time by Hermann Staudinger (by reaction of bromoacetyl bromide with metallic zinc) The dehydration of acetic acid was reported in 1910.

The thermal decomposition of acetic anhydride was also described.

Natural occurrence
Ethenone has been observed to occur in space, in comets or in gas as part of the interstellar medium.

Use 
Ethenone is used to make acetic anhydride from acetic acid. Generally it is used for the acetylation of chemical compounds.

Ethenone reacts with methanal in the presence of catalysts such as Lewis acids (AlCl3, ZnCl2 or BF3) to give β-propiolactone. The technically most significant use of ethenone is the synthesis of sorbic acid by reaction with 2-butenal (crotonaldehyde) in toluene at about 50 °C in the presence of zinc salts of long-chain carboxylic acids. This produces a polyester of 3-hydroxy-4-hexenoic acid, which is thermally or hydrolytically depolymerized to sorbic acid.

Ethenone is very reactive, tending to react with nucleophiles to form an acetyl group. For example, it reacts with water to form acetic acid; with acetic acid to form acetic anhydride; with ammonia and amines to form ethanamides; and with dry hydrogen halides to form acetyl halides.

The formation of acetic acid likely occurs by an initial formation of 1,1-dihydroxyethene, which then tautomerizes to give the final product.

Ethenone will also react with itself via [2 + 2] photocycloadditions to form cyclic dimers known as diketenes.  For this reason, it should not be stored for long periods.

Hazards 
Exposure to concentrated levels causes humans to experience irritation of body parts such as the eye, nose, throat and lungs. Extended toxicity testing on mice, rats, guinea pigs and rabbits showed that ten-minute exposures to concentrations of freshly generated ethenone as low as 0.2 mg/liter (116 ppm) may produce a high percentage of deaths in small animals. These findings show ethenone is toxicologically identical to phosgene.

The formation of ketene in the pyrolysis of vitamin E acetate, an additive of some e-liquid products, is one possible mechanism of the reported pulmonary damage caused by electronic cigarette use.
A number of patents describe the catalytic formation of ketene from carboxylic acids and acetates, using a variety of metals or ceramics, some of which are known to occur in e-cigarette devices from patients with e-cigarette or vaping product-use associated lung injury (EVALI).

Occupational exposure limits are set at 0.5 ppm (0.9 mg/m3) over an eight-hour time-weighted average. 
An IDLH limit is set at 5 ppm, as this is the lowest concentration productive of a clinically relevant physiologic response in humans.

References

Literature
 Tidwell, Thomas T. Ketenes, 2nd edition. John Wiley & Sons, 2006, .

External links

Ketenes
Gases
Pulmonary agents
Acetylating agents